Aldo Tomás Luján Fernández (born 11 february 1998) is an Argentine professional footballer who plays as a winger for San Martín SJ, on loan from Boca Juniors.

Career
Fernández started his career with local team Ambos Mundos, before joining Boca Juniors; via a trial with Barcelona. Primera B Nacional side Agropecuario completed the loan signing of Fernández on 10 August 2018, with the forward making his professional debut for the newly promoted side on 31 August against Instituto. A 1–1 draw with Temperley on 15 September saw Fernández start for the first time in senior football.

Career statistics
.

References

External links

1998 births
Living people
People from Junín, Buenos Aires
Argentine footballers
Argentine expatriate footballers
Association football forwards
Primera Nacional players
Uruguayan Primera División players
Boca Juniors footballers
Club Agropecuario Argentino players
Cerro Largo F.C. players
Club Atlético Tigre footballers
San Martín de San Juan footballers
Argentine expatriate sportspeople in Uruguay
Expatriate footballers in Uruguay
Sportspeople from Buenos Aires Province